Bayard is a city in Guthrie County, Iowa, United States. The population was 405 in the 2020 census, a decline from 536 in 2000 census. It is part of the Des Moines–West Des Moines Metropolitan Statistical Area.

History
Bayard was platted in 1882.

Geography
Bayard's longitude and latitude coordinatesin decimal form are 41.852198, -94.557261.

Demographics

2010 census
As of the census of 2010, there were 471 people, 202 households, and 121 families living in the city. The racial makeup of the city was 98.7% White, 0.2% African American, 0.4% Asian, and 0.6% from two or more races. Hispanic or Latino of any race were 1.1% of the population.

There were 202 households, of which 28.2% had children under the age of 18 living with them, 48.5% were married couples living together, 5.9% had a female householder with no husband present, 5.4% had a male householder with no wife present, and 40.1% were non-families. 35.6% of all households were made up of individuals, and 15.9% had someone living alone who was 65 years of age or older. The average household size was 2.29 and the average family size was 2.95.

The median age in the city was 39.8 years. 25.1% of residents were under the age of 18; 8.3% were between the ages of 18 and 24; 21.5% were from 25 to 44; 26.5% were from 45 to 64; and 18.7% were 65 years of age or older. The gender makeup of the city was 53.3% male and 46.7% female.

2000 census
As of the census of 2000, there were 536 people, 221 households, and 135 families living in the city. The racial makeup of the city was 99.07% White, 0.19% Native American, 0.19% Asian, and 0.56% from two or more races. Hispanic or Latino of any race were 1.12% of the population.

There were 221 households, out of which 26.7% had children under the age of 18 living with them, 48.4% were married couples living together, 9.5% had a female householder with no husband present, and 38.5% were non-families. 35.7% of all households were made up of individuals, and 23.5% had someone living alone who was 65 years of age or older. The average household size was 2.29 and the average family size was 2.97.

In the city, the population was spread out, with 24.1% under the age of 18, 7.6% from 18 to 24, 19.6% from 25 to 44, 19.4% from 45 to 64, and 29.3% who were 65 years of age or older. The median age was 44 years. For every 100 females, there were 91.4 males. For every 100 females age 18 and over, there were 81.7 males.

The median income for a household in the city was $24,444, and the median income for a family was $32,344. Males had a median income of $27,143 versus $16,477 for females. The per capita income for the city was $13,073. About 16.8% of families and 23.2% of the population were below the poverty line, including 34.3% of those under age 18 and 20.6% of those age 65 or over.

Government
Allen Long was elected mayor in 2015 and will serve until 2019.

Thomas Wardyn was elected mayor in 2020 and will serve until 2024

Education
It is in the Coon Rapids–Bayard Community School District. The district was established on July 1, 1988, by the merger of the Bayard and Coon Rapids school districts.

See also 

 Krushchev in Iowa Trail
 Lemonade Ride

References

External links

Cities in Iowa
Cities in Guthrie County, Iowa
Des Moines metropolitan area
Populated places established in 1883
1882 establishments in Iowa